Kalateh-ye Teymuri (also Romanized as Kalāteh-ye Teymūrī; also known as Kalāteh-ye Mūrī) is a village in Tabadkan Rural District, in the Central District of Mashhad County, Razavi Khorasan Province, Iran. At the 2006 census, its population was 48, in 12 families.

References 

Populated places in Mashhad County